Maya & Miguel is an American animated children's television series produced by Scholastic Productions with animation by Starburst Animation Studios and by Yeson Entertainment. It aired on PBS Kids Go! from October 11, 2004, to October 10, 2007, and had a total of five seasons and 65 episodes over three years. The show also ran on Univision's Saturday morning Planeta U block. 

The series focuses on the lives of pre-teen Hispanic twins named Maya and Miguel Santos and their friends, the program is aimed at promoting multiculturalism and education. Various times throughout the episode, parts of the dialogue are in Spanish, but only individual words or phrases are then explained in English.

As of 2021, the show is currently distributed by 9 Story Media Group.

Synopsis
The show presents learning as fun, relevant and rewarding for all children, with a special emphasis on the Latino population. The show chronicles the adventures of two 10-year-old Latino siblings, Maya and Miguel Santos, as they figure out how to leave their stamp on the world around them, and features their relatives and diverse neighborhood friends. This show centers on Maya's well-intentioned meddling in her family and friends' lives, ultimately creating new quandaries to fix. Their mother is from Mexico, and their father is from Puerto Rico. The underlying message is the importance of doing good for the family and community, and the philosophy that shared happiness is greater than personal gain. The show presents a positive, culturally rich portrayal of Latino family, language and cultures. In some markets, each episode ends with Maya announcing, "Here's what some of our friends are up to," introducing live-action clips of children engaging and interacting in ways consistent with the show's themes. Maya concludes episodes by exhorting viewers to "visit your local library like 'Maya & Miguel'".

Characters

 Maya Santos (voiced by Candi Milo) is a sweet, gentle, and energetic girl of Mexican and Puerto Rican descent. She always manages to include her twin brother and friends into her crazy adventures. Whenever Maya comes up with an idea, she always says "¡Éso es!" (That's it!) and her hair bubbles light up while her ponytail spins around; as shown in "The Bet" they will continue to glow until she says "¡Éso es!". She can sometimes be very stubborn, ignorant, and naive, and tends to get involved in other people's business. Although her ideas often don't go the way she plans them, they always accomplish their original objective in the end. Maya's heart is always in the right place.
 Miguel Santos (voiced by Nika Futterman) is Maya's twin brother. Miguel is slightly more practical and sensible than his sister, and enjoys playing soccer and video games. Every time Maya gets an idea, he gets a bad feeling about it. He knows Maya means well, but he thinks she gets more involved in other people's problems than need be. He keeps track of Maya's ideas that have gone wrong, which annoys Maya. However, he would sometimes admit that an idea of hers is the best idea yet. He has a crush on a girl named Kylie, who apparently feels the same way.
 Theodore "Theo" McEwen (voiced by Jerod Mixon) is Miguel's best friend and soccer buddy. He is African-American. Theo loves sports as much as Miguel does. Theo often gets straight A's in his classes, arguably making him the most intelligent of the kids. Theo is often the voice of reason among his friends.
 Margaret "Maggie" Lee (voiced by Lucy Liu) is Maya's Chinese-American friend. She is very dramatic, kind, fashionable, and talented. She rarely disagrees with Maya's ideas.
 Christine "Chrissy" Lum (voiced by Beth Payne) is Maya's Dominican-American friend, and describes herself as Afro-Dominican. She is very sensitive and level-headed, though sometimes she can also be gullible. Chrissy tends to point out the flaws in Maya's plans, similar to Miguel. She also loves animals.
 Andrew "Andy" Arlington (voiced by Jeannie Elias) is another friend of Miguel's. He is an English-American boy who was born with only one arm. Often seen in the background with Miguel and Theo, he likes to play soccer, basketball, and baseball. Andy moved to Maya and Miguel's neighborhood from Wisconsin.
 Alberto "Tito" Chávez voiced by Candi Milo is Maya and Miguel's cousin who moved to the US from Mexico with his parents. He lives in the same apartment complex. He admires his cousin Miguel; in the episode "I've Got to Be 'Mi-Guel'" he is shown pretending to act as if he is Miguel (which makes Miguel rather pleased, but eventually annoyed at one point). He loves to play soccer like the twins.
 Abuela Elena (voiced by Lupe Ontiveros) is Maya and Miguel's maternal grandmother.
 Paco (voiced by Carlos Alazraqui) is an anthropomorphic bilingual macaw who is the twins' pet, originally owned by their abuela. Most commonly heard saying "Pretty Bird" and "What about Paco, what about Paco?". He often gets loose, causing much trouble and confusion. Paco also often reacts to figures of speech (mostly ones about birds), thinking they are real.
Rosa Santos (voiced by Elizabeth Peña) is Santiago's wife and Maya and Miguel's mother who was originally from Mexico.
Santiago Santos (voiced by Carlos Ponce) is Rosa's husband and Maya and Miguel's father who was originally from Puerto Rico.

Episodes

Series overview

Season 1 (2004)

Season 2 (2004–05)

Season 3 (2005–06)

Season 4 (2005–07)

Season 5 (2006–07)

Broadcast history 
In the United States, the series originally premiered on October 11, 2004, (along with Postcards from Buster) on PBS Kids Go!. The series ended on October 10, 2007. As of 2022, PBS Stations KLCS and KVCR-DT still carry the show.

Internationally, the series aired on CBBC in the United Kingdom. It also aired on Boomerang in Latin America debuting on June 3, 2006. In Brazil, the series aired on Discovery Kids. In France, the show aired on France 5 and Gulli. In Turkey, the show aired on TV8 (Turkey). In Israel, it aired on Arutz HaYeladim. It also aired on Nickelodeon (Australia and New Zealand) in Australia. In the Philippines, it aired on ABS-CBN.

Home media 

There have been three Maya & Miguel DVD and VHS releases released by Lionsgate Home Entertainment. In addition, the entire series is available on digital purchase.

References

External links
 

2000s American animated television series
2004 American television series debuts
2007 American television series endings
American children's animated comedy television series
American children's animated education television series
American television series with live action and animation
Animated television series about children
Animated television series about families
Animated television series about siblings
Animated television series about twins
Elementary school television series
English-language education television programming
Spanish-language education television programming
PBS Kids shows
PBS original programming
Animated duos
Fictional twins
Hispanic and Latino American television
Television shows about disability